The Ministry of Intelligence ( Misrad HaModi'in) is a government ministry in Israel. It oversees policies related to the operation of the intelligence organizations, the Mossad and the Shabak (Israel Security Agency), in support of the national security of the State of Israel, in coordination with and under the guidance of the prime minister. The current Minister of Intelligence is Gila Gamliel.

The Ministry of Intelligence is based on the model of the United States' Office of the Director of National Intelligence. It is charged with maintaining contact with the intelligence organizations and ensuring that they execute the directives of the political echelon; examining the structure of the intelligence organizations and initiating and leading plans for their improvement; formulating a work plan for the intelligence community, in coordination with the heads of all its members; designing and synchronizing national projects that relate to the intelligence community in its entirety; acting as a mediator between the heads of the various organizations in the intelligence community; drafting recommendations for the Prime Minister when needed; and performing budgetary oversight for the intelligence organizations.

In addition, the Ministry of Intelligence develops and creates national-civilian intelligence, which deals with broader aspects of national security. This intelligence supports planning and strategic decision-making processes in all government ministries by linking security aspects with civilian ones.

As part of its involvement in national-civilian intelligence, the Ministry of Intelligence established the inter-ministerial and inter-organizational forum, "Line of Horizon Forum", whose members include representatives of government ministries, intelligence and defense establishments, civilian organizations and researchers. The forum serves as the basis for a mechanism that is currently being built in the Ministry to look ahead, and it includes researchers and a technological laboratory that provide assistance to decision-makers on the national level.

List of ministers

References 

 
Intelligence
Ministry of Intelligence
Israel
Intelligence
Military intelligence